Lagoon Pocket is a rural locality in the Gympie Region, Queensland, Australia. In the  Lagoon Pocket had a population of 123 people.

Geography
Mary Valley Road (State Route 51) forms most of the western boundary. The Mary Valley Branch Railway passes through from north-west to south, forming part of the north-western boundary. The former Lagoon Pocket railway station was outside the locality to the north, on the boundary between The Dawn and Long Flat. The Mary River forms almost the entire eastern boundary.

History 
Lagoon Pocket Provisional School opened on 25 September 1882 but closed in December 1899 to allow a new building to be constructed. It reopened on 6 Jun 1900 as Lagoon Pocket State School. It closed on 3 July 1970.

In the  Lagoon Pocket had a population of 123 people.

Reference 

Gympie Region
Localities in Queensland